The following is a list of aircraft of the Royal Thai Air Force, past, present, and future.

Current

Armament

Gallery

Future aircraft

Purchase Programme
 Additional Saab JAS 39C/D Gripen fighters procurement – Royal Thai Air Force (RTAF) plans to purchase 6 additional Saab JAS 39C/D Gripen fighters.
 Additional KAI T-50TH Golden Eagle Lead-in fighter training procurement – Royal Thai Air Force (RTAF) plans to purchase 2 additional KAI T-50TH Golden Eagle which will increase the fleet size of this type from 12 to 14.
 Lockheed Martin F-35 Lightning II procurement - Royal Thai Air Force (RTAF) has a plans to purchase the new fighter aircraft for replacing the Northrop F-5E/F Tiger II, General Dynamics F-16A/B Fighting Falcon Block 15 ADF and Block 15 OCU fleet that expected to retire within 2031. The RTAF plans to purchase 8 or 12 Lockheed Martin F-35A Lightning II in 103 Squadron Korat Royal Thai Air Force Base, expected to announced an official order in FY2023. By 12 January 2022 Thailand's cabinet endorsed the Royal Thai Air Force (RTAF) plan to purchase a four fighter jets of first batch, at an estimated cost of 13.8 billion baht, the spending will be spread over the next four fiscal years.

Upgrade Programme
 Northrop F-5TH Super Tigris upgrade – Royal Thai Air Force (RTAF) has signed the contract with Elbit Systems, currently upgrading Northrop F-5E/F Tiger II which had avionics and weapons upgrades, becoming functionally equivalent to fourth generation fighter, it is equipped with new glass cockpit with Head-up display, EL/M-2032, tactical datalink, Sky Shield jamming pod and are capable of firing the beyond visual range air-to-air Derby missile. At first, RTAF has plan to upgrade 14 aircraft However, One upgraded F-5THF two-seat version crashed during training on 3 December 2021, resulting in final number reduced to 13.
 Dornier Alpha Jet TH upgrade – Royal Thai Air Force (RTAF) has signed the contract with RV Connex, currently upgrading Dornier Alpha Jet A to equipped a new glass cockpit with Head-up display, new HOTAS controller and avionics upgrade from CMC Electronics with 14 aircraft planned.
 Saab JAS 39C/D Gripen MS20 upgrade – Royal Thai Air Force (RTAF) has plans to upgrade the entire fleet of Saab JAS 39C/D Gripen with MS20 standards

Indigenous Programme
 RTAF-6 – Royal Thai Air Force (RTAF) plans to produce 25 planes.

Historic aircraft
Aircraft of the Royal Thai Air Force and its precursors, the Siamese Flying Corps (1914–1919), Royal Siamese Air Service (RSAS) (1919–1937) and Royal Siamese Air Force (RSAF) (1937–1939).

Gallery

See also
 Royal Thai Air Force Museum
 Military of Thailand
 Royal Thai Army
 Royal Thai Navy

References
Notes

Comments

Bibliography

 Wieliczko, Leszek A. and Zygmunt Szeremeta. Nakajima Ki 27 Nate (bilingual Polish/English). Lublin, Poland: Kagero, 2004. .

External links
 
 RTAF Official website (English version)
 Royal Thai Air Force Museum Many Historical Aircraft (English)
 Illustrated reports about the RTAF
 Globalsecurity.org

Thailand
Royal Thai Air Force

Thai military-related lists